Agojo so'jo (Tewa: 'Big star') is a god in Native American Tewa mythology. He represents the Morning star, the brightest star in the morning.

'Agojo so'jo was the husband of the Evening Star. They were once mortals, but when the Evening Star died, 'agojo so'jo pursued her. Once 'agojo so'jo reached his wife, he could not bring himself to sleep with her, so he escaped. The Evening Star then gave chase to her husband. This eternal pursuit continues, presumably representing the transition of day and night. In San Juan Tewa stories, the wife sometimes overtake the husband, as the wife, thought to be deceased and without a heart, is a faster runner.

'Agojo so'jo is associated with warfare, and was addressed during times of war. He is also considered to be the messenger of the Sun.

His name is alternately transliterated as 'agoyo so'yu, 'agcjcsċ'jċ, and he is also known as agoyonohuseh (Tewa: 'Dark Star Man'). There was also a Nambé Tewa clan named after the deity.

The Hano Tewa worships a similar deity known as Ponu'chona. Ponu'chona is also identified with the morning star, and is associated with animals and hunting. Hunters would leave food offering for Ponu'chona. Similarly, the San Juan Tewa had a tale in which the Morning Star set free animals from the sky corral and distribute them on earth.

Citations

References
 
 
 
 

Tewa
Gods of the indigenous peoples of North America
Hunting gods
Animal gods
War gods
Stellar gods